Captain Clive Beverley Glynn  (9 April 1893 – 4 December 1946) was a British soldier of the First World War, who entered the infantry as a private. After being commissioned as an officer, he transferred into the Royal Flying Corps, trained as a fighter pilot, and became a flying ace credited with eight aerial victories. Although he returned to military service in May 1939 before the start of the Second World War, his service was truncated by ill health in 1941.

Early life
Clive Beverley Glynn was born in Liverpool, Lancashire. He was the tenth of eleven children born to the noted physician Dr. Thomas Robinson Glynn  (1841–1931), Professor of Medicine at Liverpool University from 1884, who had six children with his first wife, Octavia de Paiva, before marrying Clive's mother, Alice Lewtas Griffin in 1885, and fathering five more. Clive Glynn had three older step-brothers and three older step-sisters; he also had two elder sisters and an elder brother, as well as a younger one.

World War I
Glynn served originally in the 10th (Scottish) Battalion, Liverpool Regiment; he was raised from the ranks, being promoted from private to second lieutenant on 17 November 1914. He was promoted to lieutenant on 4 December 1914, and was appointed an acting-captain on 12 May 1915, serving as adjutant until 14 November.  He applied for transfer to the Royal Flying Corps, and on 10 May 1917 was seconded from the Liverpool Regiment to the Royal Flying Corps with the rank of second lieutenant to serve as a flying officer, having relinquished his acting rank. However, on 31 May 1917 he was promoted to captain in his regiment with precedence from 1 June 1916.

After completing pilot training, he was posted to No. 56 Squadron RFC on 17 June 1917. He did not serve there long, being returned to Britain for additional training. He was reassigned, being posted to No. 74 Squadron RFC. He returned to France with this squadron, landing on the Western Front in early 1918. He scored his first aerial victory with them on 29 April, just after the RFC became part of the RAF. On 1 June he was appointed an acting-captain to serve as a flight commander in the squadron.

Glynn was awarded the Distinguished Flying Cross after his double victory on 1 October 1918, although it was not gazetted until 3 December 1918.
His citation read:

Distinguished Flying Cross
Lieutenant (Acting-Captain) Clive Beverley Glynn (Liverpool Regiment).
This officer has shown remarkable skill and bravery in aerial combat, never hesitating to attack, without regard to disparity of numbers. He has accounted for four machines—two in one flight.

Combat record

Post World War I
On 20 February 1919 the engagement of Glynn and Marian King, of Dawlish, Devon, was announced.

On 30 September 1921 Glynn relinquished his commission and left the Royal Air Force.

Glynn returned for duty in World War II; he was appointed a pilot officer on probation on 2 May 1939 in the Royal Air Force Volunteer Reserve, and confirmed as such on 29 August 1939. However, he had to surrender his commission on 3 May 1941, due to poor health. Glynn died on 4 December 1946, and was buried in Cullompton Cemetery on 9 December.

References
Notes

Bibliography
 

1893 births
1946 deaths
Military personnel from Liverpool
British Army personnel of World War I
Liverpool Scottish soldiers
King's Regiment (Liverpool) officers
Royal Flying Corps officers
Royal Air Force personnel of World War I
British World War I flying aces
Recipients of the Distinguished Flying Cross (United Kingdom)
Royal Air Force Volunteer Reserve personnel of World War II
Royal Air Force officers